Christopher Fox may refer to:

Christopher Fox (composer) (born 1955), English composer
Christopher Fox (actor) (born 1974), English actor
Christopher Fox, Baron Fox
Christopher Fox, father of Religious Society of Friends founder George Fox